A number of steamships have been named Normannia, including:
, in service 1890–1906
, in service 1912–1940
, in service 1952–1978.

References

Ship names